Ellisoniidae is an extinct family of conodonts, a kind of primitive chordate.

Genera
Genera are:
 †Ellisonia
 †Foliella
 †Hadrodontina
 †Parapachycladina
 †Parafurnishius
 †Stepanovites

References

External links 

 
 Ellisoniidae at fossilworks.org (retrieved 22 April 2016)

Conodont families
Prioniodinida